Alexander Pavlovich Shlemenko (born 20 May 1984) is a Russian mixed martial artist currently fighting in the Middleweight division. He is most notable for fighting for Bellator Fighting Championships, where he is the former Bellator Middleweight World Champion. Alexander is an expert in hand-to-hand combat and traditional kickboxing. He trains at the "Saturn Profi" sports club in Omsk, Russia, and holds a degree in Physical Culture (specialization – Combat Sports Trainer) at the Siberian University of Physical Culture. Shlemenko is ranked as the #8 Middleweight in the world by Fight!Magazine and #22 Middleweight according to global-mma.com rankings.

Background
As a teenager, Alexander did skiing and Greco-Roman wrestling. At the age of 15, Shlemenko seriously started to train ARB, which is the Russian abbreviation for "army hand-to-hand combat". He competed in many regional and national tournaments in ARB, and got to the highest sport level by reaching the title of "master of sports".

Mixed martial arts career

Fighting for the IAFC
After watching a professional pankration tournament, Shlemenko immediately wanted to try it out. Shortly after that, he made his professional MMA-debut in 2004 at the age of 20 in his hometown Omsk, winning by TKO. During the early stage of his professional MMA-career, Shlemenko competed in the IAFC (International Absolute Fighting Council). Fighting as usual multiple fights per night, Alexander won most of them by knockout, which can be seen in his record. In May 2005, after only one year of his professional MMA career, Shlemenko had an impressive 15–2 record, and was gaining more and more attention by the Russian fans and the media.

Rise to prominence
After the IAFC, Shlemenko fought in various organizations such as M-1 Mixfight and BodogFight. He competed in EliteXC before the company went defunct. Its assets have been acquired by Strikeforce, having made his successful U.S. debut on their 10 October 2008 ShoXC show on Showtime.

Alexander won most of his fights, often by KO or TKO. Through the series of wins, some of his losses were corner posts for his development as a fighter and his whole MMA-career.

Shlemenko vs. Ronaldo "Jacaré" Souza
In April 2006, Alexander faced the future Strikeforce Middleweight Champion Ronaldo Souza at Jungle Fight 5. Early in the first round, Jacaré moved the fight to the ground, and got a full mount position. After some heavy ground and pound, Jacaré submitted Shlemenko by an arm triangle choke. Shlemenko didn't tap and got choked unconscious.
In his blog, Alexander later said, that he lost this fight, because he was a "young fool". According to his own words, Shlemenko didn't even have a clue about fighting on the ground or grappling at all, he was still training as an ARB fighter (there is no ground game in ARB). Competing in MMA was just a hobby to gain some money while studying. After this fight, Shlemenko started to prepare himself like a professional mixed martial artist, training grappling as well.

According to one of his blogs, Shlemenko said that right now he would have a good chance to win in a rematch with "Jacaré".

Shlemenko vs. Jose "Pelé" Landi Jons
As Alexander stated during an interview in 2010, the hardest fight of his career was the rematch with Jose "Pelé" Landi Jons in September 2006. The reason for this was, that Shlemenko noticed after the first round that he has broken both of his hands, but he still continued to fight.

Jose "Pelé" Landi Jons won by a disputed decision.

Shlemenko vs. Jordan Radev
The only knockout loss of his career Alexander received from Jordan Radev, a Bulgarian Olympic wrestler and mixed martial artist. Alexander caught a heavy left hook in the second round, which knocked him out.

Later, in an interview Shlemenko said that this loss made him stronger, and gave him a lot of motivation to train harder.

Bellator MMA
In 2010, Shlemenko signed with Bellator and made his debut in the Season Two Middleweight Tournament at Bellator 16, defeating Matt Major via unanimous decision.

In the semi-finals of the tournament, Alexander defeated Jared Hess, after Hess dislocated his knee, forcing the TKO via stoppage.

Shlemenko then faced Bryan Baker in the Bellator Middleweight tournament final on 24 June 2010 at Bellator 23. He won the fight via TKO in the first round to become the Bellator Season Two Middleweight Tournament winner. In addition to a $100,000 check for winning the tournament, Shlemenko obtained a chance to fight against Hector Lombard for the Bellator Middleweight Championship title at Bellator 34 on 28 October 2010.

On 28 October 2010 at Bellator 34, Alexander Shlemenko faced Hector Lombard. Lombard controlled nearly the whole fight, landing elusive striking combinations and heavy elbows from Shlemenko's guard. Despite taking a lot of damage that would've finished most opponents, Shlemenko actively fought back and even won the 5th round on the judges scorecards with a few well placed knees, some spinning backfists and stuffing takedown attempts. This was due to Hector Lombard relying mostly on takedowns to win the rounds after Shlemenko figured out his timing on the feet.

Season Five Middleweight tournament
In the opening round of the Bellator Season Five Middleweight Tournament, Shlemenko fought Zelg Galesic, a Croatian mixed martial artist with a Tae Kwon Do background. This fight was anticipated as an interesting striking match between two experienced stand-up fighters. Despite these expectations, Alexander won via standing guillotine choke in the first round, proving his rarely seen submission skills.

In the semifinal round, Shlemenko faced Brian Rogers, an American fighter noted for many first round stoppages due to striking. Rogers came out aggressively in the first round, landing striking combinations. After a lost first round, Shlemenko started to dictate the pace of the fight early in the second round. A landed backfist, followed by heavy knee strikes to the head brought Rogers in trouble in the first half of the round. After both fighters exchanged some punches, Alexander managed to land another unanswered series of heavy knees to the head of Rogers, which forced the referee to stop the fight at 2:31 of the second round. After the fight Alexander stated in his blog, that he was rather nervous during the fight, and that he saw Brian Rogers as a very athletic and explosive opponent.

In the tournament finals, Shlemenko faced Vitor Vianna, a two-time world BJJ-champion. Nearly the whole fight Alexander dominated in stand-up punching exchanges, which brought him a win by unanimous decision. This win earned Shlemenko a rematch for the title against Hector Lombard.  However, Lombard signed with the Ultimate Fighting Championship and the Bellator Middleweight Championship was vacated as a result.

Middleweight championship
On 25 April 2012, Bellator CEO Bjorn Rebney announced that the winner of the Season Six Middleweight Tournament Finale Maiquel Falcão would face Shlemenko to crown the company's new Middleweight Champion. The two men met at Bellator 88 on 7 February 2013 for the vacant title.  Shlemenko won via knock out in the second round.

Shlemenko was expected to face Bellator Season Eight Middleweight Tournament winner Doug Marshall on 7 September 2013 at Bellator 98. However, on 19 August, Marshall was forced out of the title bout due to an injury and was replaced by Season 8 Middleweight Tournament runner up Brett Cooper. In the rematch Shlemenko defeated Cooper via unanimous decision to retain the Bellator Middleweight Championship.

The title fight with Doug Marshall eventually took place on 22 November 2013 at Bellator 109. Shlemenko won the fight via knockout in the first round with a body punch, successfully defending his title for the second time.

Shlemenko faced Bellator Season Nine Middleweight Tournament winner Brennan Ward at Bellator 114 on 28 March 2014. He won via guillotine choke submission in the second round to retain the Bellator Middleweight Championship.

In order to appear on the inaugural Bellator pay-per-view, Shlemenko moved up in weight to face Tito Ortiz in his Bellator MMA debut on 17 May 2014 at Bellator 120. He lost by submission via arm-triangle choke in the first round.

Shlemenko put up his Middleweight title against undefeated Brandon Halsey on 26 September 2014 at Bellator 126. He lost the fight and the title by submission at just thirty-five seconds into the first round.

Fight Nights Global (EFN)
After his loss to Tito Ortiz, Shlemenko was expected to face Yasubey Enomoto at Fight Nights: Battle of Moscow 16 on 11 July 2014. However, the bout was cancelled for unknown reasons. The fight eventually took place on 20 December 2014 at Fight Nights: Battle of Moscow 18. Shlemenko won by unanimous decision.

M-1 Global
Shlemenko faced former M-1 Global middleweight Champion Vyacheslav Vasilevsky on 19 February 2016 at M-1 Challenge 64. He won the fight via split decision.

Shlemenko returned to M-1 four months later to face Vyacheslav Vasilevsky in a rematch on 16 June 2016 at M-1 Challenge 64.  Despite being battered by Vasilevsky in the first two rounds, Shlemenko rallied and won the fight via guillotine choke in the third round.

Return to Bellator
Shlemenko faced fellow knockout artist Melvin Manhoef in the main event at Bellator 133 on 13 February 2015. He won the bout by knockout due to a spinning back fist in the second round. On 17 March 2015, Shlemenko was suspended indefinitely for failing a post fight drug test with elevated testosterone levels. The result was changed to a No Contest. In June 2015, the California State Athletic Commission (CSAC) suspended Shlemenko for an unprecedented three years with a $10,000 fine. In September 2015, Shlemenko filed a writ against the CSAC to have his three-year suspension overturned. In July 2016, Shlemenko won his appeal and his suspension was lifted and his fine lowered 50%.

In his first fight in Bellator post-suspension, Shlemenko faced Kendall Grove in the main event at Bellator 162 on 21 October 2016.  After a back-and-forth first round, Shlemenko won the bout in the second round due to a liver shot and right hook combination followed by strikes on the ground.

Shlemenko faced newly signed middleweight Gegard Mousasi at Bellator 185 on 20 October 2017. Shlemenko still lost the back-and-forth fight by controversial unanimous decision. Seven out of eleven MMA media outlets scored the fight as a decision win for Shlemenko.

Shlemenko competed in M-1 Global against Bruno Silva at M-1 Challenge 93 – Shlemenko vs. Silva on June 1, 2018. He lost the fight via first-round knockout.

Shlemenko faced Anatoly Tokov on 13 October 2018 at Bellator 208. He lost the fight via unanimous decision.

Free Agent
After the stint in Bellator, Shlemenko faced Jonas Billstein at his native Russian Cagefighting Championship 5 on 15 December 2018. He won the fight via submission in the second round.

Next Shlemenko faced Viscardi Andrade at Russian Cagefighting Championship 6 on 4 May 2019. He won the fight via technical knockout in the third round.

Shlemenko faced Chris Honeycutt at Eastern Economic Forum: Roscongress Vladivostok Combat Night on September 15, 2019. He lost the fight via unanimous decision.

Shlemenko fought David Branch at Russian Cagefighting Championship 7 on 14 December 2019. He won via a guillotine choke submission in the first round.

Shlemenko faced Márcio Santos on 7 May 2021 at AMC Fight Nights 101. He won the bout via unanimous decision.

On October 17, 2021, Alexander Shlemenko met with Artur Guseinov in the main fight of the EFC 42 tournament. The fight lasted all three rounds and ended with Shlemenko's victory by unanimous decision.

On 3 March 2022, Shlemenko supported the 2022 Russian invasion of Ukraine.

Shlemenko faced Aleksandar Ilić on August 26, 2022 at RCC 12. He lost the bout via TKO stoppage 22 seconds into the bout, after getting caught by a knee and dropped.

Shlemenko faced Cleber Sousa on September 30, 2022 at Shlemenko FC 5. He fought to a split decision draw.

Shlemenko faced Magomed Ismailov on December 3, 2022 at RCC 13, losing the bout via unanimous decision.

Fighting style
Shlemenko is known for his unorthodox striking style, which is difficult to refer to as traditional Muay Thai, Kickboxing, or ARB. Alexander is known for his knee strikes, he also often uses techniques such as the spinning backkick or spinning backfist. As stated in many interviews, he prefers to fight stand-up rather than on the ground, always trying to knock his opponent out. Often esteemed as a pure striker, Shlemenko also has some grappling skills, which he showed by defeating via submission among others Gregory Babene and Zakir Lalashov (both via triangle choke). Alexander switches from southpaw to orthodox during his fights. In his blog he says, that he can fight equally in both positions.

Beside his technical skills, Alexander shows impressive cardio during his fights, which he attributes to skiing as a teenager.

Training

Alexander Shlemenko trains twice a day at the "Saturn Profi" sports club in Omsk, Russia. Although of his young age, but through his big experience in MMA and his degree in sport science Shlemenko is already active as a trainer too. His students Alexander Sarnavskiy and Andrey Koreshkov are looked as top prospects in mixed martial arts, showing impressive ground game and stand-up skills. As of March 2015, Sarnavskiy has a record of 30–2 while Koreshkov won Bellator Welterweight Championship on 17 July 2015.

During Bellator Season 5 Middleweight Tournament, Shlemenko and his students were training for three months in the US, at HB Ultimate Sports Center or Reign MMA, working together with BJ Penn and Mark Muñoz among other top MMA-fighters.

Championships and accomplishments

Mixed martial arts
Bellator Fighting Championships
Bellator Middleweight World Championship (One time)
Three successful title defenses
Tied with Rafael Carvalho for the most successful Middleweight title defenses in Bellator history. (3)
Bellator Season 2 Middleweight Tournament Championship
Bellator Season 5 Middleweight Tournament Championship
M-1 Global
M-1 Global Middleweight Grand Prix Champion
World Kickboxing Network
World Kickboxing Network MMA European 75 kg Championship
International Absolute Fighting Council
IAFC 2005 World Pankration Championship Tournament Championship
IAFC 2005 Championship of Asia Tournament Championship
IAFC 2004 Stage of Russia Tournament Championship
IAFC 2004 Stage of Russia Cup 5 Tournament Championship
IAFC 2004 Russian Pankration Championship Tournament Championship
IAFC 2004 Stage of Russia Cup 4 Tournament Championship
IAFC 2004 Pancration Asian Open Cup Tournament Runner-up
IAFC 2004 Stage of Russia Cup 3 Tournament Championship
Cup of Empire
Cup of Empire 2004 Tournament Runner-up
Sherdog
2011 All-Violence Third Team
2010 All-Violence Third Team

Mixed martial arts record

|-
|Loss
|align=center| 61–15–1 (1) 
|Magomed Ismailov
|Decision (unanimous)
|RCC 13
|
|align=center|5
|align=center|5:00
|Yekaterinburg, Russia
|
|-
|Draw
|align=center|
|Cleber Sousa
|Draw (split)
|Shlemenko FC 5
|
|align=center|3
|align=center|5:00
|Omsk, Russia
|
|-
|Loss
|align=center| 61–14 (1)  
|Aleksandar Ilić
|TKO (knee and punches)
|RCC 12
|
|align=center|1
|align=center|0:22
|Yekaterinburg, Russia
|
|-
|Win
|align=center| 61–13 (1)  
|Artur Guseinov
|Decision (unanimous)
|EFC 42
|
|align=center|3
|align=center|5:00 
|Sochi, Russia
|
|-
|Win
|align=center| 60–13 (1)
|Márcio Santos
|Decision (unanimous)
|AMC Fight Nights 101
|
|align=center|3
|align=center|5:00
|Vladivostok, Russia
|
|-
|Win
|align=center| 59–13 (1)
|David Branch
|Submission (guillotine choke)
|Russian Cagefighting Championship 7
|
|align=center|1
|align=center|4:58
|Yekaterinburg, Russia
|
|-
|Loss
|align=center| 58–13 (1)
|Chris Honeycutt
|Decision (unanimous)
|Eastern Economic Forum: Roscongress Vladivostok Combat Night
|
|align=center|5
|align=center|5:00
|Vladivostok, Russia
|
|-
|Win
|align=center| 58–12 (1)
|Viscardi Andrade
|TKO (punches)
|Russian Cagefighting Championship 6
|
|align=center|3
|align=center|3:37
|Chelyabinsk, Russia
|
|-
|Win
|align=center| 57–12 (1)
|Jonas Billstein
|Submission (guillotine choke)
|Russian Cagefighting Championship 5
|
|align=center|2
|align=center|1:15
|Yekaterinburg, Russia
|
|-
|Loss
|align=center| 56–12 (1)
|Anatoly Tokov
|Decision (unanimous)
|Bellator 208
|
|align=center|3
|align=center|5:00
|Uniondale, New York, United States
|
|-
|Loss
|align=center| 56–11 (1)
|Bruno Silva
|KO (punches)
|M-1 Challenge 93 – Shlemenko vs. Silva
|
|align=center|1
|align=center|2:54
|Chelyabinsk, Russia
|
|-
|Loss
|align=center| 56–10 (1)
|Gegard Mousasi
|Decision (unanimous)
|Bellator 185
|
|align=center|3
|align=center|5:00
|Uncasville, Connecticut, United States
|
|-
|Win
|align=center| 56–9 (1)
| Brandon Halsey
|TKO (body kick and punches)
|M-1 Challenge 79 - Shlemenko vs. Halsey 2
|
|align=center|1
|align=center|0:25
|Saint Petersburg, Russia
|
|-
|Win
|align=center| 55–9 (1)
|Paul Bradley
|Decision (unanimous)
|M-1 Challenge 75 - Shlemenko vs. Bradley
|
|align=center|3
|align=center|5:00
|Moscow, Russia
|
|-
|Win
|align=center| 54–9 (1)
|Kendall Grove
|TKO (punches)
|Bellator 162
|
|align=center|2
|align=center|1:43
|Memphis, Tennessee, United States
|
|-
| Win
| align=center| 53–9 (1)
| Vyacheslav Vasilevsky
| Submission (guillotine choke)
| M-1 Challenge 68
| 
| align=center| 3
| align=center| 2:09
| Saint Petersburg, Russia
| 
|-
| Win
| align=center| 52–9 (1)
| Vyacheslav Vasilevsky
| Decision (split)
| M-1 Challenge 64
| 
| align=center| 3
| align=center| 5:00
| Moscow, Russia
| 
|-
| NC
| align=center| 51–9 (1)
| Melvin Manhoef
| NC (overturned)
| Bellator 133
| 
| align=center| 2
| align=center| 1:25
| Fresno, California, United States
| 
|-
| Win
| align=center| 51–9 
| Yasubey Enomoto
| Decision (unanimous)
| Fight Nights: Battle of Moscow 18
| 
| align=center| 3
| align=center| 5:00
| Moscow, Russia
| 
|-
| Loss
| align=center| 50–9
| Brandon Halsey
| Technical Submission (rear-naked choke)
| Bellator 126
| 
| align=center| 1
| align=center| 0:35
| Phoenix, Arizona, United States
| 
|-
| Loss
| align=center| 50–8
| Tito Ortiz
| Technical Submission (arm-triangle choke)
| Bellator 120
| 
| align=center| 1
| align=center| 2:27
| Southaven, Mississippi, United States
| 
|-
| Win
| align=center| 50–7
| Brennan Ward
| Submission (guillotine choke)
| Bellator 114
| 
| align=center| 2
| align=center| 1:22
| West Valley City, Utah, United States
| 
|-
| Win
| align=center| 49–7
| Doug Marshall
| TKO (body punch)
| Bellator 109
| 
| align=center| 1
| align=center| 4:28
| Bethlehem, Pennsylvania, United States
| 
|-
| Win
| align=center| 48–7
| Brett Cooper
| Decision (unanimous)
| Bellator 98
| 
| align=center| 5
| align=center| 5:00
| Uncasville, Connecticut, United States
| 
|-
|  Win
| align=center| 47–7
| Maiquel Falcão
| KO (punches)
| Bellator 88
| 
| align=center| 2
| align=center| 2:18
| Duluth, Georgia, United States
| 
|-
|  Win
| align=center| 46–7
| Anthony Ruiz
| Decision (unanimous)
| League S-70: Russian Championship Final
| 
| align=center| 3
| align=center| 5:00
| Sochi, Russia
| 
|-
|  Win
| align=center| 45–7
| Ikuhisa Minowa
| TKO (knee and body punches)
| SFL 2
| 
| align=center| 1
| align=center| 2:20
| Chandigarh, India
| 
|-
|  Win
| align=center| 44–7
| Julio Paulino
| Decision (unanimous)
| FEFoMP: Battle of Empires
| 
| align=center| 3
| align=center| 5:00
| Khabarovsk, Russia
| 
|-
|  Win
| align=center| 43–7
| Vitor Vianna
| Decision (unanimous)
| Bellator 57
| 
| align=center| 3
| align=center| 5:00
| Rama, Ontario, Canada
| 
|-
|  Win
| align=center| 42–7
| Brian Rogers
| TKO (knees)
| Bellator 54
| 
| align=center| 2
| align=center| 2:30
| Atlantic City, New Jersey, United States
| 
|-
|  Win
| align=center| 41–7
| Zelg Galešic
| Submission (guillotine choke)
| Bellator 50
| 
| align=center| 1
| align=center| 1:55
| Hollywood, Florida, United States
| 
|-
|  Win
| align=center| 40–7
| Antonio Santana
| KO (punch)
| League S-70: Russia vs. Brazil
| 
| align=center| 1
| align=center| 1:29
| Sochi, Russia
| 
|-
|  Win
| align=center| 39–7
| Brett Cooper
| Decision (unanimous)
| Bellator 44
| 
| align=center| 3
| align=center| 5:00
| Atlantic City, New Jersey, United States
| 
|-
|  Win
| align=center| 38–7
| Nick Wagner
| KO (punch)
| Fight Festival 30
| 
| align=center| 1
| align=center| 3:13
| Helsinki, Finland
| 
|-
| Loss
| align=center| 37–7
| Hector Lombard
| Decision (unanimous)
| Bellator 34
| 
| align=center| 5
| align=center| 5:00
| Hollywood, Florida, United States
| 
|-
| Win
| align=center| 37–6
| Bryan Baker
| TKO (punches)
| Bellator 23
| 
| align=center| 1
| align=center| 2:45
| Louisville, Kentucky, United States
| 
|-
| Win
| align=center| 36–6
| Jared Hess
| TKO (knee injury)
| Bellator 20
| 
| align=center| 3
| align=center| 2:20
| San Antonio, Texas, United States
| 
|-
| Win
| align=center| 35–6
| Matt Major
| Decision (unanimous)
| Bellator 16
| 
| align=center| 3
| align=center| 5:00
| Kansas City, Missouri, United States
| 
|-
| Win
| align=center| 34–6
| Sean Salmon
| TKO (knees to the body)
| Fight Festival 27
| 
| align=center| 1
| align=center| 0:40
| Helsinki, Finland
| 
|-
| Win
| align=center| 33–6
| Jean-François Lénogue
| KO (spinning back fist)
| Saturn & RusFighters: Battle of Gladiators
| 
| align=center| 2
| align=center| 1:43
| Omsk, Russia
| 
|-
| Win
| align=center| 32–6
| Maksim Nevolia
| Submission (rear-naked choke)
| IAFC: Mayor's Cup 2009
| 
| align=center| 1
| align=center| 1:15
| Novosibirsk, Russia
| 
|-
| Loss
| align=center| 31–6
| Jordan Radev
| KO (punch)
| Fight Festival 26
| 
| align=center| 1
| align=center| 4:27
| Helsinki, Finland
| 
|-
| Win
| align=center| 31–5
| Patrick Kincl
| Decision (unanimous)
| Hell Cage 4
| 
| align=center| 3
| align=center| 5:00
| Prague, Czech Republic
| 
|-
| Win
| align=center| 30–5
| Petras Markevicius
| Decision (unanimous)
| IAFC: Russia vs. the World
| 
| align=center| 3
| align=center| 5:00
| Novosibirsk, Russia
| 
|-
| Win
| align=center| 29–5
| Bubba McDaniel
| TKO (flying knee to the body)
| ShoXC: Elite Challenger Series
| 
| align=center| 1
| align=center| 5:00
| Hammond, Indiana, United States
| 
|-
| Win
| align=center| 28–5
| Gregory Babene
| Submission (triangle choke)
| BSCF: Siberian Challenge 2
| 
| align=center| 1
| align=center| 4:48
| Bratsk, Russia
| 
|-
| Win
| align=center| 27–5
| Mikko Suvanto
| KO (punches)
| fightFORCE: Russia vs. The World
| 
| align=center| 1
| align=center| N/A
| St. Petersburg, Russia
| 
|-
| Win
| align=center| 26–5
| Diego Visotzky
| KO (head kick)
| BodogFIGHT: USA vs. Russia
| 
| align=center| 1
| align=center| 2:11
| Moscow, Russia
| 
|-
| Win
| align=center| 25–5
| Lalashov Zakir
| Submission (triangle choke)
| BSCF: Siberian Challenge 1
| 
| align=center| 2
| align=center| 2:20
| Bratsk, Russia
| 
|-
| Win
| align=center| 24–5
| Scott Henze
| KO (spinning back fist)
| BodogFIGHT: Vancouver
| 
| align=center| 1
| align=center| 0:57
| Vancouver, British Columbia, Canada
| 
|-
| Win
| align=center| 23–5
| Andre Balschmieter
| TKO (punches)
| Bratsk Combat Sport Festival
| 
| align=center| 1
| align=center| 2:30
| Russia
| 
|-
| Loss
| align=center| 22–5
| Jose Landi
| Decision (unanimous)
| WFC 2: Evolution
| 
| align=center| 3
| align=center| 5:00
| Koper, Slovenia
| 
|-
| Loss
| align=center| 22–4
| Ronaldo Souza
| Technical Submission (arm-triangle choke)
| Jungle Fight 6
| 
| align=center| 1
| align=center| 2:10
| Manaus, Brazil
| 
|-
| Win
| align=center| 22–3
| Shavkat Urakov
| Submission (triangle choke)
| APF: World Pankration Championship 2006
| 
| align=center| N/A
| align=center| N/A
| Astana, Kazakhstan
| 
|-
| Win
| align=center| 21–3
| Beslan Isaev
| Submission (triangle choke)
| rowspan=3|APF: World Pankration Championship 2005
| rowspan=3| 
| align=center| 3
| align=center| N/A
| rowspan=3| Astana, Kazakhstan
| 
|-
| Win
| align=center| 20–3
| Murad Magomedov
| TKO (corner stoppage)
| align=center| N/A
| align=center| N/A
| 
|-
| Win
| align=center| 19–3
| Vasily Novikov
| TKO (corner stoppage)
| align=center| 1
| align=center| N/A
| 
|-
| Loss
| align=center| 18–3
| Jose Landi
| Decision
| Jungle Fight 5
| 
| align=center| 3
| align=center| 5:00
| Manaus, Brazil
| 
|-
| Win
| align=center| 18–2
| Sergey Naumov
| TKO (punches)
| M-1 MFC: Russia vs. France
| 
| align=center| 2
| align=center| 4:50
| St. Petersburg, Russia
| 
|-
| Win
| align=center| 17–2
| Sergey Gubin
| KO (punch)
| IAFC: Pancration Siberian Open Cup 2005
| 
| align=center| N/A
| align=center| N/A
| Omsk, Russia
| 
|-
| Win
| align=center| 16–2
| Ubaidula Chopolaev
| Decision
| M-1 MFC: New Blood
| 
| align=center| 2
| align=center| 5:00
| St. Petersburg, Russia
| 
|-
| Win
| align=center| 15–2
| Vasily Krilov
| Decision
| rowspan=3|IAFC: Championship of Asia
| rowspan=3|
| align=center| 3
| align=center| N/A
| rowspan=3| Jakutsk, Russia
| 
|-
| Win
| align=center| 14–2
| Musa Pliev
| Decision
| align=center| 3
| align=center| N/A
| 
|-
| Win
| align=center| 13–2
| Sergei Akinen
| KO (knee)
| align=center| 1
| align=center| N/A
| 
|-
| Win
| align=center| 12–2
| Vener Galiev
| TKO (injury)
| rowspan=3| IAFC: Stage of Russia Cup
| rowspan=3| 
| align=center| 1
| align=center| N/A
| rowspan=3| Ulianovsk, Russia
| 
|-
| Win
| align=center| 11–2
| Pavel Jaroslavtcev
| TKO (punches)
| align=center| 1
| align=center| N/A
| 
|-
| Win
| align=center| 10–2
| Murad Madomedov
| TKO (punches)
| align=center| 3
| align=center| N/A
| 
|-
| Win
| align=center| 9–2
| Jakov Burbolenko
| TKO (punches)
| rowspan=3| IAFC: Russian Pankration Championship
| rowspan=3| 
| align=center| 2
| align=center| N/A
| rowspan=3| Omsk, Russia
| 
|-
| Win
| align=center| 8–2
| Evgenij Zaviazochnikov
| Submission (guillotine choke)
| align=center| 1
| align=center| N/A
| 
|-
| Win
| align=center| 7–2
| Vasiliy Blinov
| TKO (punches)
| align=center| 2
| align=center| N/A
| 
|-
| Win
| align=center| 6–2
| Jeihun Aliev
| TKO (punches)
| rowspan=2| IAFC: Stage of Russia Cup 4
| rowspan=2| 
| align=center| 2
| align=center| N/A
| rowspan=2| Samara, Russia
| 
|-
| Win
| align=center| 5–2
| Magomed Sultanakhmedov
| Decision (unanimous)
| align=center| 2
| align=center| 5:00
| 
|-
| Loss
| align=center| 4–2
| Vener Galiev
| Decision (unanimous)
| rowspan=2| Cup of Empire 2004
| rowspan=2| 
| align=center| N/A
| align=center| N/A
| rowspan=2|Kazan, Russia
| 
|-
| Win
| align=center| 4–1
| Abdul Aziz Malaaiev
| Decision (unanimous)
| align=center| N/A
| align=center| N/A
| 
|-
| Loss
| align=center| 3–1
| Beslan Isaev
| Submission (armbar)
| rowspan=2| IAFC: Pancration Asian Open Cup 2004
| rowspan=2| 
| align=center| 1
| align=center| N/A
| rowspan=2| Yakutsk, Russia
| 
|-
| Win
| align=center| 3–0
| Anton Veisbekker
| KO (punch)
| align=center| N/A
| align=center| N/A
| 
|-
| Win
| align=center| 2–0
| Alexander Yakovlev
| TKO (punches)
| rowspan=2|IAFC: Stage of Russia Cup 3
| rowspan=2| 
| align=center| 2
| align=center| N/A
| rowspan=2|Omsk, Russia
| 
|-
| Win
| align=center| 1–0
| Zulfinar Sultanmagomedov
| TKO (doctor stoppage) 
| align=center| 1
| align=center| N/A
|

See also
List of male mixed martial artists

References

External links

1984 births
Doping cases in mixed martial arts
Living people
Russian male mixed martial artists
Russian sportspeople in doping cases
Middleweight mixed martial artists
Mixed martial artists utilizing ARB
Mixed martial artists utilizing pankration
Sportspeople from Omsk
Bellator MMA champions